Post Scriptvm is a Russian-American industrial music act based in New York City. They have been active since 1998. Full names and personal details of the members are not publicized.

The musical style of Post Scriptvm is rooted in the dark ambient, old school industrial, and experimental genres ranging from eerie, hypnotic soundscapes to focused industrial noise assaults, often within a single track. The project does not use computer-based software synthesizers or drum machines, preferring analog synthesizers, samplers, scrap metal percussion, field recordings, traditional acoustic instruments, as well as various analog and digital hardware effects.

Post Scriptvm albums explore subjects including mental illness, altered states of mind, social disintegration, western esotericism, and apocalyptic religious cults. The project draws inspiration from the art and literary movements of the early 20th century, particularly Russian Futurism. Many compositions and lyrics are based on the poetry of Russian Futurists like Vladimir Mayakovsky, Aleksei Kruchenykh, and Bozhidar. The 2016 EP Тучи Над Борском (Russian for "Thunderclouds over Borsk"), was released as a limited edition cassette tape. It aims to recreate the atmosphere of the rituals of Russia's underground religious sects.

In the mid-2000s the project's early works attracted the attention of Tesco Organisation, who proceeded to issue the band's three best-known albums—Распадъ (2006), Grey Eminence (2010) and Benommenheit (2014). In 2015 Tesco reissued Post Scriptvm's first full-length album Gauze, a long out-of-print CD-R release, as a vinyl LP—a part of the Tesco Archaic Documents series.

Post Scriptvm's infrequent live performances have earned critical acclaim. The group has performed at prominent industrial and experimental electronic music festivals on the East and West coasts of the US and in Europe; including the 2005 and 2007 editions of the Apex Fest in New York, the 2007 edition of the Wroclaw Industrial Festival in Poland, and the 2013 Epicurean Escapism Festival] in Berlin. In 2015, German record label The Epicurean released a live retrospective album, recorded at various locations during the period of 2003 to 2014, as a deluxe limited edition LP titled Séance.

Discography

References 

Musical groups established in 1999
Industrial music groups
Dark ambient music groups
Noise musical groups
Russian industrial music groups
American industrial music groups
1999 establishments in New York City